Le Québécois is a political newspaper based in Quebec City. Founded in 2001, it is a medium of the Quebec sovereignty movement. The newspaper also has a militant wing, the Réseau de Résistance du Québécois.

Description 
Originally backed by the Société nationale des Québécois et des Québécoises de la Capitale, Le Québécois is now independent. It notably featured columns from filmmaker, activist and intellectual Pierre Falardeau and the former sovereigntist Premier of Quebec Jacques Parizeau.

It is responsible for the creation of Québec-Radio, the fund-raising beer La Militante and manages the Éditions du Québécois publishing house.

Controversies 
It has been featured in two fairly notable controversies. One regarded a harsh and raw critical article by Pierre Falardeau on federalist thinker Claude Ryan, shortly after the latter's death in the February/March 2004 edition.

The second controversy was raised in 2005 by Le Québécois about then future Governor General of Canada Michaëlle Jean and her and husband Jean-Daniel Lafond's ties to the sovereignty movement and the Front de libération du Québec.

See also 
List of sovereigntist media
List of Quebec media
Quebec nationalism
Quebec politics
Québécois
List of newspapers in Canada

References

External links
Official website

French-language newspapers published in Quebec
Newspapers published in Quebec City
Quebec sovereigntist media
Publications established in 2001
2001 establishments in Quebec